Michael Pitts may refer to:
 Michael Pitts (pastor) (born 1964), Cornerstone Church pastor
 Michael Pitts (politician) (born 1955), member of the South Carolina House of Representatives
 Mike Pitts (born 1960), American football player
 Mike Pitts (archaeologist), British prehistory archaeologist